Sokolac is a municipality of the city of Istočno Sarajevo, Republika Srpska, Bosnia and Herzegovina.

Sokolac may also refer to any of the following places:

Sokolac, Montenegro, a village in Bijelo Polje Municipality
Sokolac, Ljubovija, a village in the Ljubovija municipality, Mačva District, Central Serbia
Sokolac Castle, a castle in Brinje, Croatia
Bački Sokolac, a village in the Bačka Topola municipality, North Bačka District, Vojvodina, Serbia 
Banatski Sokolac, a village in the Plandište municipality, South Banat District, Vojvodina, Serbia
Sokolac na Uni, a fortress and an example of the medieval-period architecture of Bosnia and Herzegovina
Sokolac, another name for Soko Grad, a medieval city and fortress near Sokobanja, Serbia

See also 
 Sokolovići (disambiguation)
 Sokolović, a surname
 Sokolovo (disambiguation)
 Sokolov (disambiguation)
 Sokol (disambiguation)
 Soko (disambiguation)